Geoffrey Brian Hunt,  (born 11 March 1947), is a retired Australian squash player who is widely considered to be one of the greatest squash players in history.

He was ranked the World No.1 squash player from 1975 to 1980. He won the World Open title four times. He was the event's inaugural champion, winning the competition on the first four occasions it was held (1976, 1977, 1979 and 1980). He also won the International Amateur Individual Championship three times (1967, 1969, and 1971), and the British Open (which was considered to be the effective world championship event involving both amateurs and professionals before the World Open began) eight times between 1969 and 1981. Hunt won 178 of the 215 tournaments he contested during his career.

Hunt was born in Melbourne and now resides in Queensland.  He won the Australian Junior Championship in 1963, and he first won the Australian Amateur Men's Championship in 1965.

Hunt was known for having great determination. He ultimately suffered back problems, which curtailed his career.

After retiring as a player, Hunt served as the Head Squash Coach at the Australian Institute of Sport from 1985–2003, where he helped develop a new generation of Australian squash stars. He then worked for 8 years at the Aspire Academy in Doha, Qatar. Following his retirement and move back to Australia, he has continued to coach Qatari professional player Abdulla Mohd Al Tamimi.

In the 1972 New Years Honours Hunt was made a Member of the Order of the British Empire (MBE) for services to sport and international relations. He became a Member of the Order of Australia (AM) in the 1982 Australia Day Honours and received the Australian Sports Medal in 2000.

Hunt has been inducted into the World Squash Federation Hall of Fame and the Sport Australia Hall of Fame.

World Open final appearances

British Open final appearances

Books
Geoff Hunt on Squash (London: Cassell) 1977.

References

External links 
 Page at squashpics.com
 Monash University alumni profile
 

1947 births
Living people
Australian male squash players
Australian Members of the Order of the British Empire
Monash University alumni
Sport Australia Hall of Fame inductees
Australian Institute of Sport coaches
Members of the Order of Australia
Recipients of the Australian Sports Medal